Deshabhimani ('Patriot') was a Tamil-language weekly newspaper published from Colombo, an organ of the Communist Party of Sri Lanka. Deshabhimani emerged in the 1950s. During its initial years, it had a circulation of around 10,000. As of the late 1950s and early 1960s, H.M.P. Mohiden was the editor-in-chief of the publication (he was expelled in the Sino-Soviet split in 1963). As of the early 1970s, P. Ramanathan was the editor of the newspaper.

References 

Communist newspapers
Communist Party of Sri Lanka organs
Defunct weekly newspapers
Defunct newspapers published in Sri Lanka
Tamil-language newspapers published in Sri Lanka
Weekly newspapers published in Sri Lanka
Mass media in Colombo